"Señor Don Gato" is a children's song about a cat who is sitting on a roof reading a letter from his true love who has agreed to marry him. In his excitement, he falls off and injures himself. The veterinarian is unable to save him and he dies. However, as his funeral procession passes through the market, the scent of fish from the market is so strong that he returns to life.

This English version, by Margaret Marks, is familiar to generations of school-age children in North America due to its inclusion in Making Music Your Own, Grade 3 (copyright 1964 by the Silver Burdett Company). The lyrics are loosely translated from the traditional Spanish song "Estaba el señor Don Gato", but the melody is from a different song, "Ahora Que Vamos Despacio". There is also a French version of "Estaba el señor Don Gato" called "Monsieur le Chat".

Lyrics
Oh, Señor Don Gato was a cat,

On a high red roof Don Gato sat.

He went there to read a letter, Meow, meow, meow

Where the reading light was better, Meow, meow, meow

It was a love note for Don Gato.

"I adore you," wrote the lady cat

Who was fluffy, white, and nice and fat.

There was not a sweeter kitty, Meow, meow, meow

In the country or the city, Meow, meow, meow

And she said she'd wed Don Gato.

Oh, Don Gato jumped so happily,

He fell off the roof and broke his knee.

Broke his ribs and all his whiskers, Meow, meow, meow

And his little solar plexus, Meow, meow, meow

"¡Ay caramba!" cried Don Gato.

Then the doctors all came on the run,

Just to see if something could be done.

And they held a consultation, Meow, meow, meow

About how to save their patient, Meow, meow, meow

How to save Señor Don Gato.

But in spite of everything they tried,

Poor Señor Don Gato up and died.

Oh it wasn't very merry, Meow, meow, meow

Going to the cemetery, Meow, meow, meow

For the ending of Don Gato.

As the funeral passed the market square,

Such a smell of fish was in the air.

Though the burial was slated, Meow, meow, meow

He became re-animated, Meow, meow, meow

He came back to life, Don Gato.

In popular culture
“Señor Don Gato” is sung in the film The Loneliest Planet.

A cat called "Señor Don Gato" appears in the video game Neko Atsume.

A season 2 episode of Call Me Kat was called "Call me Senor Don Gato" (though the song was not featured in it).

References

Spanish children's songs
Songs about cats
Songs about marriage
Songs about death
Fictional cats